The Odd Fellows Hall is a historic building located at 516 Main St. in Salmon, Idaho. The building was constructed in 1874 as a meeting place for Salmon's chapter of the International Order of Odd Fellows. The wood frame building was designed in the Greek Revival style and features Ionic pilasters on its front face. A wooden front designed to resemble cast iron was added to the building in 1888. The Odd Fellows built a new meeting hall, the Salmon Odd Fellows Hall, in 1907. The original building is one of the few remaining fraternal halls from the 1800s in Idaho.

The building was listed on the National Register of Historic Places (NRHP) in 1978. The 1907 Odd Fellows building which replaced it is also on the NRHP.

References

Clubhouses on the National Register of Historic Places in Idaho
Cultural infrastructure completed in 1874
Buildings and structures in Lemhi County, Idaho
Salmon
Greek Revival architecture in Idaho
National Register of Historic Places in Lemhi County, Idaho